The Bishop of Arundel and Brighton is the ordinary of the Roman Catholic Diocese of Arundel and Brighton in the Province of Southwark, England.

The bishop's official residence is Bishop's House, The Upper Drive, Hove, East Sussex.

The most recent former bishop was the Right Reverend Kieran Thomas Conry, the fourth bishop of the diocese, who announced his resignation on 27 September 2014, and which was accepted by Pope Francis on 4 October 2014. On 21 May 2015, Pope Francis appointed Richard Moth to be the fifth bishop of Arundel and Brighton. He was installed on 28 May 2015 at Arundel Cathedral.

The Diocese of Arundel and Brighton was created on 28 May 1965 out of the Diocese of Southwark when the latter was elevated to archdiocese status.

The diocese covers 4,997 km2 and consists of the counties of East and West Sussex and Surrey outside the Greater London Boroughs. The see is in the town of Arundel where the bishop's seat is located in the Cathedral Church of Our Lady & Saint Philip Howard.

List of the Bishops of the Roman Catholic Diocese of Arundel and Brighton

References